Taesŏng-guyŏk, or Taesŏng District is one of the 18 guyok that constitute Pyongyang, North Korea.

Administrative divisions
Taesŏng-guyŏk is divided into 15 tong (neighbourhoods):

 Anhak-tong 안학동 (安鶴洞)
 Ch'ŏng'am-dong 청암동 (淸岩洞)
 Ch'ŏngho-dong 청호동 (淸湖洞)
 Kammun-dong 갑문동 (閘門洞)
 Kosan-dong 고산동 (高山洞)
 Miam-dong 미암동 (嵋岩洞)
 Misan 1-dong 미산 1동 (嵋山 1洞)
 Misan 2-dong 미산 2동 (嵋山 2洞)
 Rimhŭng-dong 림흥동 (林興洞)
 Ryongbuk-tong 룡북동 (龍北洞)
 Ryonghŭng 1-dong 룡흥 1동 (龍興 1洞)
 Ryonghŭng 2-dong 룡흥 2동 (龍興 2洞)
 Ryonghŭng 3-dong 룡흥 3동 (龍興 3洞)
 Ryongnam-dong 룡남동 (龍南洞)
 Taesŏng-dong 대성동 (大城洞)

Districts of Pyongyang